Easy is the second studio album released by the Australian rock band Grinspoon. It was released on 1 November 1999, debuting at No. 4 on the Australian album charts and remaining in the top 50 for 13 weeks. It eventually achieved platinum sales in Australia.

Work on the album began in August 1999 with the producer Jonathan Burnside (Nirvana, Melvins, Depeche Mode, Meat Beat Manifesto). The album was recorded in Sydney and mixed in Melbourne. The initial release of the album included a bonus disc containing eleven live tracks from the band's New Year's Eve performance at the 1998 Falls Festival.

Four singles were released from the album, "Ready 1", "Secrets", "Rock Show" and "Violent and Lazy", of which "Ready 1" charted in the ARIA Singles Chart at No. 36, "Secrets" at No. 83 and "Rock Show" at No. 78. "Ready 1" was voted in at No. 33 on Triple J's Hottest 100 for 1999, with "Rock Show" and "Secrets" both polling on Triple J's Hottest 100 for 2000, where they reached No. 33 and No. 73 respectively.

The album received two nominations at the Aria Awards in 2000, "Best Rock Album" and "Engineer of the Year".

Reception
Easy gained positive reviews from outlets such as Sputnik Media and Rolling Stone Australia. According to the Worldwide Home of Australasian Music and More Online (WHAMMO), Easy "finds [Grinspoon] in great grungy form with such tracks as 'American Party Bomb', 'Undercover', 'Secrets' and the excellent 'Ordinary' — a word which has nothing to do with this disc".

Professional reviews

Track listing

Charts

Weekly charts

Year-end charts

Certifications

Releases

References

1999 albums
Grinspoon albums